Manuel Aramayo (24 December 1955 – 13 July 1999) was a Bolivian alpine skier. He competed at the 1988 Winter Olympics and the 1992 Winter Olympics.

References

1955 births
1999 deaths
Bolivian male alpine skiers
Olympic alpine skiers of Bolivia
Alpine skiers at the 1988 Winter Olympics
Alpine skiers at the 1992 Winter Olympics
Place of birth missing